Selfie Dad is a 2020 American faith-based comedy-drama film written and directed by Brad J. Silverman. It stars stand-up comedian Michael Jr. as Ben Marcus, a former stand-up comic who attempts to become a social media star. The film's cast also includes Chonda Pierce, James Denton, Karen Abercrombie, and Jamie Grace.

Selfie Dad was originally scheduled for a theatrical release, but was instead released on video-on-demand (VOD) services due to the COVID-19 pandemic.

Cast
 Michael Jr. as Ben Marcus
 Chonda Pierce as Rosie
 James Denton as Steve
 Karen Abercrombie as Carol
 Jamie Grace as Herself

Reception
Joe Leydon of Variety called Selfie Dad "a more emotional and satisfying piece of work" in comparison to a previous film by writer-director Silverman, Grace Unplugged (2013). Leydon also wrote that Selfie Dad contains, "beneath all the funny business, some well-observed truths" regarding race relations in the United States, but noted that, "right now, those truths may be, well, more than a tad distracting from the story Silverman set out to tell."

Shannon M., in a review of the film for The Dove Foundation (a non-profit organization that publishes reviews "based on Christian values"), called it "a heart-warming film that reveals the truth of Hebrews 4:12."

References

External links
 
 

2020 films
Films about Christianity
Films about social media
Films not released in theaters due to the COVID-19 pandemic
2020s English-language films
American comedy-drama films
2020 comedy-drama films
2020s American films